Rock Island Trail is a 1950 American Western film directed by Joseph Kane and written by James Edward Grant. The film stars Forrest Tucker, Adele Mara, Lorna Gray, Bruce Cabot, Chill Wills and Barbra Fuller. The film was released on May 18, 1950, by Republic Pictures.

Plot
As the boss of the Rock Island Trail Company a contractor of the US government which builds railroad tracks for the expanding railway Reed Loomis has to enter into rivalry with stagecoach and riverboat companies like the one who is led by Kirby Morrow. Morrow does not hesitate to embark on sabotage to stop competitors.

After a sabotage attempt where a riverboat was deliberately driven into the pile of a railroad bridge which was severely damaged, the matter goes on trial. A lawyer Abraham Lincoln is hired by Loomis to defend the case on court, Lincoln who has found a child as a witness and consultant manages to win the trial. The Riverboat company has to rebuild the bridge.

Loomis is engaged to Constance Strong the rich and beautiful daughter of David Strong a banker, although Constance wants to marry him as soon as possible, he refuses to do so before he has not become a rich man himself.

In another attempt to stop Loomis and his men, Morrow convinces the chief of an indian tribe to attack a train with Loomis and his crew on board. The attack fails, Morrow is captured and killed.

Finally the Rock Island Trail Company achieves its goals and Loomis  marries Constance in a train.

Cast
Forrest Tucker as Reed Loomis
Adele Mara as Constance Strong
Lorna Gray as Aleeta 
Bruce Cabot as Kirby Morrow
Chill Wills as Hogger McCoy
Barbra Fuller as Annabelle Marsh
Grant Withers as David Strong
Jeff Corey as Abe Lincoln
Roy Barcroft as Barnes
Pierre Watkin as Major
Valentine Perkins as Annette
Jimmy Hunt as Stinky Tanner
Olin Howland as Saloonkeeper 
Noble Johnson as Bent Creek
John Holland as Maj. Porter
Kate Drain Lawson as Mrs. McCoy
Dick Elliott as Martin
Emory Parnell as Sen. Wells
Billy Wilkerson as Lakin

References

External links
 

1950 films
American Western (genre) films
1950 Western (genre) films
Republic Pictures films
Films directed by Joseph Kane
Trucolor films
1950s English-language films
1950s American films